New York’s 31st congressional district was a congressional district for the United States House of Representatives in New York.  It was eliminated as a result of the 2000 Census. It was last represented by Amo Houghton who was redistricted into the 29th District.

Voting

Past components

 1863–1875: Parts of Buffalo
 1875–1897: All of Wyoming, Genesee and Niagara counties
 1875–1897: All of Wyoming, Genesee and Niagara counties
 1903–1913: All of Cayuga, Ontario, Wayne and Yates counties
 1913–1945: All of Clinton, Essex, Franklin, and St. Lawrence counties
 1945–1953: All of Fulton, Hamilton, Montgomery, Otsego, and Schenectady counties
 1953–1963: All of Clinton, Essex, Saratoga, Warren, and Washington counties; parts of Rensselaer county
 1963–1969: All of Franklin, Jefferson, Lewis, Oswego, and St. Lawrence counties
 1969–1971: All of Clinton, Franklin, Jefferson, Lewis, Oswego, and St. Lawrence counties
 1971–1973: All of Clinton, Franklin, Jefferson, and St. Lawrence counties; parts of Essex, and Oswego counties
 1973–1983: All of Fulton, Hamilton, Herkimer, Oneida, and Schoharie counties; parts of Montgomery, Otsego, and Schenectady counties
 1983–1993: All of Wyoming county; parts of Cattaraugus, Erie, Livingston, and Ontario counties
 1993–2003: All of Allegany, Cattaraugus, Chautauqua, Chemung, Schuyler, Steuben, and Yates counties; parts of Cayuga, Seneca, and Tompkins counties

List of members representing the district

Election results 
Note that in New York State electoral politics there are numerous minor parties at various points on the political spectrum. Certain parties will invariably endorse either the Republican or Democratic candidate for every office, hence the state electoral results contain both the party votes, and the final candidate votes (Listed as "Recap").

References 

 Congressional Biographical Directory of the United States 1774–present
 2000 House election data Clerk of the House of Representatives
 1998 House election data "
 1996 House election data "

31
Former congressional districts of the United States
Constituencies established in 1833
Constituencies disestablished in 2003
1833 establishments in New York (state)
2003 disestablishments in New York (state)